Robin Gibson (15 May 1930 – 28 March 2014) was an Australian architect, from Brisbane, Queensland.

Personal life
Robert Findlay ('Robin') Gibson was born in Brisbane in 1930, and attended the Yeronga State School and Brisbane State High School. He studied Architecture at the University of Queensland, and graduated with a Diploma of Architecture in 1954 (at that time, the diploma was the professional qualification). During his part-time years in university, he worked in a number of architectural offices in Brisbane and, in particular, gained much knowledge from the progressive firm Hayes and Scott. After graduating, Gibson moved to London and worked with the practices of James Cubitt, Sir Hugh Casson and his partner Neville Conder. When Gibson was in London, he traveled across Europe and became interested in modern architecture.

On his return to Brisbane in 1957, Gibson established his own practice. Most of his major projects are in Queensland, with the exception of the Belconnen Library in Canberra, Australian Capital Territory. He died at the age of 83 in March 2014.

Philosophy
According to an article in Architecture Australia magazine in 1989, Gibson was devoted to raising people's consciousness of the responsibilities of the architectural act. The writer added that Gibson took into consideration the political, social and cultural needs of the environment, and embraced awareness of the outcomes in global arenas. Gibson was quoted as saying this was "the opportunity to create something better than what exists at present". Gibson described his philosophy that "a good building is one that respects its users and accommodates the needs of those outside its walls", and that the aim of architecture is to "house and magnify the experience of living".

Robin Gibson & Partners

Robin Gibson and Partners was a Brisbane-based architectural practice, formed by Gibson in 1957. In April 1973 it won a two-stage design competition for a new Queensland Art Gallery in South Brisbane. Later, Gibson's commission expanded to the design of the whole of the current Queensland Cultural Centre at South Bank, that also included the Queensland Performing Arts Complex, the Queensland Museum and the State Library of Queensland. The company was registered at the Office of Fair Trading in Queensland in 1994, and closed in May 2013, due to Gibson's ill health.

Notable projects
Queensland Cultural Centre (1982)

The concept of educating people about culture influenced the Queensland Government to develop the Queensland Cultural Centre. The centre is to create easy access and connection for pedestrian to be more involved with every part of the site. It consists four parts: the Queensland Art Gallery, the Queensland Museum, the State Library of Queensland and the Performing Arts Complex.

Queensland Art Gallery (1975)

The Queensland Art Gallery is the first stage of the Queensland Cultural Centre. It has five levels with 15,477 areas in total. In the gallery, visitors encounter different spaces and views. Its external walkways link with the museum and the Performing Arts Centre. Furthermore, the water mall is lit with natural light through acrylic domes at the top.

Performing Arts Complex (Queensland Performing Arts Centre) (1986)

The Performing Arts Complex consists of three different areas: The Lyric Theatre, The Cremorne Theatre and The Concert Hall. It comprises the second stage of the Queensland Cultural Centre development. The smallest venue among these buildings is the Cremorne Theatre. The Concert Hall was designed as a classical hall to equip a concert grand organ that serve 2000 people. Similar to the Lyric Theatre, it can also house 2000 people. The orchestra pit can hold musicians with a full stage house facility that caters performance from dramas to grand opera. Later in 1997, the Playhouse theatre was built. This addition to the complex is a 850 seat traditional proscenium theatre.

Mayne Hall, University of Queensland (1972)

The Mayne Hall building was built in 1972. The concept is to transform the hall into a multipurpose space that is suitable for all occasions. There’s an abstract design by Nevil Matthews done on six large stained glass windows, which form the eastern facade of the foyer. In addition, there are paintings and sculptures reflecting the history of the university, lined on the north main walkway along the tall concrete recesses.

Brisbane: Arcade and Square (1982)

Since Brisbane sees the need to minimize high-rise buildings in the area, the Riverside Expressway was introduced to make the area motor vehicle friendly along the western side of the central business district. Combined with above ground and underground car parks, this ensures the needs of motorist are well served in the city centre. Not forgetting the needs of pedestrians, Queen Street Mall was introduced and also the covered Wintergarden Galleria plus other pedestrian arcades in the area.

Other works

Central Library, University of Queensland, 1973
Library and Humanities Building, Griffith University, 1975
C.M.L. Building (office tower), Brisbane, Early 1980s
Belconnen Town Centre Library, A.C.T., 1981
Queen St Mall urban works (Stage 1), Brisbane, 1982
Alterations to ANZAC Square, Brisbane, 1982
Colonial Mutual Building (office tower), Brisbane, 1984
Wintergarden (Stage 1), Brisbane, 1984
Queensland Museum, Brisbane, 1987
State Library of Queensland, Brisbane, 1988
Alterations to St Stephen’s Cathedral, Brisbane, 1988
111 George Street (office tower), Brisbane, 1993
 National Australia Remembers Freedom Wall (Mt Coot-tha Gardens, now known as the Brisbane Botanic Gardens), 1996

Awards

RAIA  Building of the Year Award: Church in Kenmore, Brisbane (1968)
Canberra Medallion and Sir Zelman Cowan Award (1982)
Queenslander of the Year (1982)
Order of Australia (1983)
Griffith University, honorary Doctorate (1986)
Advance Australia Award (1988)
RAIA Gold Medal for 'Outstanding performance and contributions to architecture' (1989)
RAIA National Awards (2000)
St Stephen's Chapel, Lachlan Macquarie Award (2000)

References

Bibliography
Architecture in Australia, 1968 Nov., v. 57, n. 6, p. 923-957
Architecture Australia, 2000 Nov.-Dec., v.89, n.6, p.[34]-69

External links
Australian Institute of Architects Australian Institute of Architects 2010 Gold Medal - 50 years of winners: 1960-2010
Australian Institute of Architects Gold Medal recipients since 1960
 Australian Institute of Architects  RAIA Lachlan Macquarie Award: Past Winners

Modernist architects
Modernist architecture in Australia
1930 births
2014 deaths
Architects from Brisbane
Recipients of the Royal Australian Institute of Architects’ Gold Medal
People educated at Brisbane State High School